Lauren Singer is an American environmental activist, entrepreneur, and blogger in the zero waste movement. She is known for collecting all of the waste she has created since 2012 in a 16oz mason jar. Her blog Trash Is for Tossers documents her lifestyle. She is the founder of Package Free and The Simply Co.

Early life and education
Singer was raised in New York City. She is Jewish. She attended NYU and received a degree in environmental studies in 2013. She went on to work as a sustainability manager for the New York City Department of Environmental Protection, prior to founding The Simply Co and Package Free.

Career and activism
In 2012, Singer began collecting the waste she produced in a 16oz mason jar and detailing her zero waste life on her blog Trash Is for Tossers. She simultaneously began making her own personal care products and changing her consumer behavior to divert waste from landfill and divest from industries that cause environmental pollution.

Singer left her full-time job in 2014 and launched The Simply Co, an organic laundry detergent company. Her product was sold via Kickstarter’s website and at wholesale locations across the United States.

In 2017, Singer opened Package Free as a three-month pop-up shop in Williamsburg.

Lauren Singer cited Rachel Carson and Bea Johnson as the authors and activists who sparked her interest in environmental sustainability.

Singer has been named a Business Insider "woman to watch", one of InStyle’s "50 badass women changing the world", and a Well+Good "2020 changemaker".

References

External links
 Trash is for Tossers, Singer's blog

New York University alumni
American bloggers
Living people
People from New York City
1991 births